The St. Philip Neri Church shelling occurred when St. Philip Neri Church in Allaipiddy village, off the coast of Sri Lanka's Jaffna Peninsula, was shelled on August 13, 2006, allegedly by the Sri Lankan Army. The attack killed at least 15 people and injured as many as 54 others.

Background
As tensions increased between the rebel Liberation Tigers of Tamil Eelam (LTTE) and the Sri Lankan Army, small clashes took place near Allaipiddy. It is believed that the LTTE was planning to overrun Jaffna. Hundreds of civilians took shelter in St. Philip Neri Church because of the fighting and to avoid shelling.

Incident
In the morning of August 12, 2006, LTTE cadres landed near Allaipiddy, prompting government forces to withdraw to the nearby Navy base. The Sri Lankan Army then commenced shelling LTTE positions, continuing through the night. According to a local human rights organization, the University Teachers for Human Rights (UTHR), security forces did not know the strength of LTTE forces in the area and "let loose their shells and MBRLs not caring an iota for the civilians".

On August 13, 2006, at 04:30, an artillery shell fell on the church, killing at least 15 people and injuring up to 54. The wounded were taken to Jaffna for treatment by a priest, Father Thiruchelvam Nihal Jim Brown, who subsequently relocated 300 families from Allaipiddy to St. Mary's Church in Kayts. He disappeared on August 20, a week after the shelling.

Responsibility
The Army denied responsibility for the shelling of the church and suggested that the LTTE was to blame. However, according to the former parish priest of Allaipiddy, most people believe that the church was hit by fire from government forces. The UTHR reported that survivors claimed that the shelling came from a military base in Palaly. AsiaNews repeated this claim.

References

2006 crimes in Sri Lanka
Attacks on buildings and structures in Sri Lanka
Attacks on civilians attributed to the Sri Lanka Army
Massacres in Sri Lanka
Mass murder in 2006
Mass murder of Sri Lankan Tamils
Sri Lankan government forces attacks in Eelam War IV
Terrorist incidents in Sri Lanka in 2006